The pike characin (Acestrorhynchus microlepis) is a species of fish in the family Acestrorhynchidae. It was described by Sir William Jardine, 7th Baronet in 1841, originally under the genus Hydrocyon. It inhabits the Orinoco and Amazon Rivers in the regions of Suriname, Guyana, and French Guiana, at a pH range of 5.5-6.5.

The pike characin feeds on bony fish. It is marketed for the aquarium hobby.

References

Acestrorhynchidae
Taxa named by Sir William Jardine
Fish described in 1841